The Greek Catholic Church of the Annunciation is the parish church of the Melkite Greek Catholic community in the city of Nazareth in northern Israel.

Description
This large church was built in 1887, adjacent to the Synagogue Church. (Due to its close proximity, the parish church is often misindentified as being the Synagogue Church.) The compound houses a primary school, secondary school, seminary, and parish.

The interior of the church has three naves divided by two rows of columns. The set is richly decorated with paintings and icons.

See also
Melkite Greek Catholic Archeparchy of Akka
Catholic Church in Israel
Greek Catholic Church

External links
 Official Facebook page
 Official Youtube channel

References

Churches in Nazareth
20th-century churches in Israel
Melkite Greek Catholic churches in Israel